Anthony Bourchier (by 1521–1551) was an English politician.

Anthony first came to prominence in November 1544 when he was appointed principal auditor to the household of Queen Catherine Parr. He would also be appointed to her council in December of that year. He remained in the Queen's service even into her widowhood and during her marriage to Lord Sudely.

It was from the Queen's patronage that Anthony became a Member (MP) of the Parliament of England for New Shoreham in 1547.

References

1551 deaths
English MPs 1547–1552
Year of birth uncertain